Tatsu is a roller coaster at the Six Flags Magic Mountain amusement park in Valencia, California, United States.

Tatsu may also refer to:

People with the name
Tatsu Aoki (born 1957), Japanese bass player and record producer
Tatsu Hirota (1904–1990), Japanese painter
Tatsu Yamashita (born 1953), Japanese singer-songwriter and record producer
Tatsu Ishimoda (1924–2022), Japanese politician
Tatsu Tanaka (1892–1985), Japanese midwife and politician
Yoshi Tatsu (born 1977), Japanese wrestler

Characters
Tatsu, a minor supporting character in the Teenage Mutant Ninja Turtles franchise
Tatsu Yamashiro, the real name of DC Comics superheroine Katana
Tatsu, the main character of the manga series The Way of the Househusband
Tatsu Hattori, a minor supporting character in the fifth and final season of ''Teenage Mutant Ninja Turtles

Other uses
Tatsu, a word for Japanese dragon
Tatsu (film), a 1994 Russian film

Japanese unisex given names